Carrie Oeding (born 1978) is an American poet.

Life
She was born and raised in Luverne, in southwestern Minnesota. She earned an MFA in Creative Writing from Eastern Washington University and a PhD in Creative Writing from Ohio University. She has taught at Ohio University, University of Houston, and is currently teaching at Bridgewater State University in East Bridgewater, Massachusetts.

Oeding's first poetry collection, Our List of Solutions (2011), won the Lester M. Wolfson Prize. Her work features in the anthologies Best New Poets 2005 and Privacy Policy: The Anthology of Surveillance Poetics (2014). In 2021, Akron University chose her poem "If I Could Give You a Line" as their 2021 Akron Poetry Prize winner. Her work has also appeared in Colorado Review, Laurel Review and Greensboro Review, and has been featured in PBS NewsHour and Verse Daily.

Publications
 If I Could Give You at Line (2023). Akron, OH: University of Akron Press. ISBN-13: 978-1629222417
 Our List of Solutions (2011). South Bend, IN: 42 Miles Press.

References

External links
"All My Friends' Barbecues Need Attending" (Poem), PBS NewsHour ArtBeat
"Work Harder" (Poem), VerseDaily.org

1978 births
21st-century American poets
21st-century American women writers
American women poets
Eastern Washington University alumni
Living people
Marshall University faculty
Ohio University alumni
Poets from Minnesota
People from Luverne, Minnesota
American women academics